The 2013 Rai Open was a professional tennis tournament played on clay courts. It was the fifth edition of the tournament which was part of the 2013 ATP Challenger Tour. It took place in Rome, Italy between 15 and 21 April 2013.

Singles main draw entrants

Seeds

 1 Rankings are as of April 8, 2013.

Other entrants
The following players received wildcards into the singles main draw:
  Filippo Baldi
  Gianluigi Quinzi
  Stefano Napolitano
  Potito Starace

The following players received entry from the qualifying draw:
  Alessio di Mauro
  Sandro Ehrat
  Martin Fischer
  Dominic Thiem

Doubles main draw entrants

Seeds

1 Rankings as of April 8, 2013.

Champions

Singles

 Julian Reister def.  Guillermo García López, 4–6, 6–3, 6–2

Doubles

 Andreas Beck /  Martin Fischer def.  Martin Emmrich /  Rameez Junaid, 7–6(7–2), 6–0

External links
Official Website

Rai Open
Rai Open